The Miss Ecuador 1984 was held on May 29, 1984. There were 12 candidates competing for the national title. At the end of night María del Mar García from Manabí crowned Leonor Gonzembach as Miss Ecuador 1984. The Miss Ecuador competed in Miss Universe 1984.

Results

Placements

Special awards

Contestants

Notes

Returns

Last compete in:

1977
 Loja

1980
 Los Ríos

1982
 Pichincha

Withdrawals

 Chimborazo
 El Oro 
 Esmeraldas 
 Tungurahua

External links

Miss Ecuador
1984 beauty pageants
Beauty pageants in Ecuador
1984 in Ecuador